John Blanch ( – 10 July 1725), of Wotton Court, near Gloucester and Eastington, Gloucestershire, was a clothier and English politician.

Family
His parentage is unknown. His first wife was Mary (d. 1686), daughter of Richard Cambridge of Woodchester, clothier, by whom he had a daughter Mary. In 1688 he married Hannah, the daughter of William Mew, rector of Eastington. His daughter Mary married Thomas Horton.

Career
He was a vociferous advocate for the local cloth trade, lobbying politicians and publishing a pamphlet The Interest of England Consider'd in an Essay Upon Wool (1694). He was a Member (MP) of the Parliament of Great Britain for Gloucester from 1710 to 1713.

References

1649 births
1725 deaths
People from Gloucester
Members of the Parliament of Great Britain for English constituencies
British MPs 1710–1713
Members of Parliament for Gloucester